Paraponera clavata, commonly known as the bullet ant, is a species of ant named for its extremely painful sting. It inhabits humid lowland rainforests in Central and South America.

Etymology
The specific epithet of the ant, means "club-shaped". The generic name, Paraponera, translates to "near-Ponera". Due to its notoriety, the ant has several Native American, Spanish, and Portuguese local names in different geographical areas. Perhaps the best known name is the Venezuelan  (the "24 ant" or "24-hour ant"), referring to the full day of pain that follows being stung; it can also refer to the time it takes to kill a human. These names derive from the Tupi–Guarani tuca-ndy, which translates to "the one wounding deeply". Other names by which it is referred include chacha, cumanagata, munuri, siámña, yolosa, and veinticuatro hora hormiga. In Costa Rica, P. clavata is known as bala, meaning "bullet". P. clavata also has several common names; it is most commonly known as the bullet ant because of the extreme pain it delivers following a sting, similar to that of getting shot. Other names are the lesser giant hunting ant and conga ant.

Taxonomy

Paraponera clavata was first described by Danish zoologist Johan Christian Fabricius in 1775, who named it Formica clavata in his Systema entomologiae, based on a worker he collected. Fabricius incorrectly listed the type locality as India, as these ants are only found in Central and South America. In 1804, P. clavata was transferred to the genus Ponera by the French zoologist Pierre André Latreille. The genus Paraponera was established by the British entomologist Frederick Smith in 1858, and P. clavata was designated as the type species by monotypy (the condition of a taxonomic group having only a single taxon described). In his book, Smith would synonymise multiple taxa under Paraponera clavata, including Formica armata, Formica spininoda, Ponera tarsalis and Ponera clavata. Later publications would also synonymise more taxa, including Formica aculeata and Formica clavata. The genus was placed in a monotypic tribe, the Paraponerini, in 1901 by the Italian entomologist Carlo Emery, who stressed the importance of certain morphological characteristics of Paraponera; Emery had also placed the tribe close to the Ectatommini. This classification was accepted by the entomological community until 1958, where the American entomologist William Brown Jr. synonymised Paraponerini and transferred Paraponera to Ectatommini. It was treated as a valid tribe in 1994, but in 2003, the English myrmecologist elevated the rank of the tribe to subfamily level as Paraponerinae, being a part of the Poneromorph subfamilies.

Under the present classification, the bullet ant is a member of the genus Paraponera in the tribe Paraponerini, subfamily Paraponerinae. It is a member of the family Formicidae, belonging to the order Hymenoptera, It was once the sole member of its own genus and tribe until the extinct Paraponera dieteri was described in 1994 by the entomologist Cesare Baroni Urbani. The ant, described from Dominican amber, existed during the Early Miocene 15 to 45 million years ago. P. dieteri can be distinguished from P. clavata by its much narrower head, length, pronotum width, petiole width and other features. The good preservation of the fossil allowed comprehensive comparisons between the two species; the body sculpture of P. dieteri suggests that the genus as a whole exhibits a slow evolutionary rate.

P. clavata is the only living species in its subfamily. Although P. dieteri was the first extinct relative of P. clavata to be described, another Paraponera fossil had been examined earlier in the 1980s. The fossil, which was from the Miocene, was found embedded in Dominican Amber from Hispaniola; at the time of discovery, the ant was the largest fossil of its kind. It showed similar characteristics to P. clavata, although it was considerably smaller. The fossil also has biogeographic importance. As P. clavata is not found in the Greater Antilles, but rather in Central and South America, this suggests that moister tropical forests covered the island during the Tertiary period. This is further supported by the fact that P. clavata is a forest ant that forages on the ground and up into bushes and trees.

Description
Paraponera is predatory, and like all primitive poneromorphs, does not display polymorphism in the worker caste; the queen ant is not much larger than the workers. They are not aggressive ants but are vicious when defending the nest, when they produce a stridulating sound and sting with ferocity.

Distribution
Paraponera is distributed throughout Central and South America, commonly found in the wet Neotropical realm. These ants are found in Honduras, El Salvador, Nicaragua and Costa Rica from the north, and in Venezuela, Colombia, Ecuador, Peru, Bolivia and Brazil from the south.

Habitat 
Colonies consist of several hundred individuals and are usually situated at the bases of trees. Workers forage arboreally in the area directly above the nest for small arthropods and nectar, often as far as the upper canopy; little foraging occurs on the forest floor. Nectar, carried between the mandibles, is the most common food taken back to the nest by foragers. Two studies in Costa Rica and on Barro Colorado Island (BCI) found about four bullet ant nests per hectare of forest. On BCI, the nests were found under 70 species of trees, six species of shrubs, two species of lianas, and one species of palm. Nests were most common beneath the canopies of Faramea occidentalis and Trichilia tuberculata, but these trees are also the most abundant in the forest. Nests were present more frequently than would be expected based on the abundance of the trees under Alseis blackiana, Tabernaemontana arborea, Virola sebifera, Guarea guidonia, and Oenocarpus mapora. The large number of nest plants suggests little active selection of nest sites by bullet ants. Small shrubs, however, are underused, probably because they do not provide access to the forest canopy. The study on BCI concluded that bullet ants may select trees with buttresses and extrafloral nectaries.

Enemies
This ant is a predator of Greta oto, the glasswing butterfly. This butterfly attempts to combat P. clavata by producing chemical extracts during the larval stage that are unpalatable to these ants.

Parasites
The small (1.5- to 2.0-mm-long) phorid fly, Apocephalus paraponerae, is a parasite of injured workers of P. clavata, of which the supply is constant because frequent aggressive encounters occur between neighbouring colonies, resulting in maimed workers. The flies are able to parasitise healthy ants if the ants are artificially restrained, but healthy ants are agile and able to repel them. Both male and female flies are attracted by the scent of injured ants; the females lay eggs, as well as feed, and the males feed and possibly mate with the females. The flies are attracted to a crushed ant within two to three minutes and 10 or more flies may be attracted to each ant. Each ant can harbour 20 fly larvae. Carl Rettenmeyer observed P. clavata actively trying to attack A. paraponerae when they approached the entrance to their nest.

Relationship with humans

Sting
The bullet ant's sting is currently the highest on Schmidt's sting pain index, at 4.0+. According to Justin O. Schmidt, the pain is like ”Walking over flaming charcoal with a three inch nail embedded in your heel". Some victims compared the pain to that of being shot, hence the name of the insect. It is described as causing "waves of burning, throbbing, all-consuming pain that continues unabated for up to 24 hours". Lymphadenopathy, edema, tachycardia and fresh blood appearing in human victim feces are common symptoms. Poneratoxin, a paralyzing neurotoxic peptide isolated from the venom, affects voltage-dependent sodium ion channels and blocks the synaptic transmission in the central nervous system. It is being investigated for possible medical applications.

Initiation rites

The Sateré-Mawé people of Brazil use intentional bullet ant stings as part of their initiation rites to become warriors. The ants are first rendered unconscious by submerging them in a natural sedative, and then 80 of them are woven into gloves made of leaves (which resembles a large oven mitt), stingers facing inward. When the ants regain consciousness, an initiator repeatedly blows smoke at the ants, with the objective of making them agitated and aggressive. Once this is done, they make the boy wear the gloves on his hands. The goal of this initiation rite is to keep the glove on for 5 to 10 minutes. When finished, the boy's hand and part of his arm are temporarily paralyzed because of the ant venom, and he may shake uncontrollably for days. The only "protection" provided is a coating of charcoal on the hands, supposedly to confuse the ants and inhibit their stinging. To fully complete the initiation, the boys must go through the ordeal 20 times over the course of several months or even years.

See also
 Myrmecia, often called bull ants or bulldog ants, also renowned for their powerful sting

 Diacamma rugosum also known as the Asian Bullet Ant.

 Fire ants

 List of ant genera (alphabetical)

References

Further reading
 
 
 Lattke, JE (2003) - Subfamilia Ponerinae in Introducción a las Hormigas de la Région Neotropical - Von Humboldt Institute, Bogota, Colombia.

External links

 Brief article about Paraponera clavata
 Short article on the bullet ant and poneratoxin
 Giant tropical bullet ant, Paraponera clavata, natural history and captive management, article with images
 YouTube video of initiation ritual
 Paraponera clavata at AntWeb
 Data for specimens collected in Grace a Dios, Honduras, the northernmost extent of its range.
 

Paraponerinae
Hymenoptera of South America
Insects of Central America
Fauna of Paraguay
Insects described in 1775
Taxa named by Johan Christian Fabricius